Siddeswara Kshetram, popularly known for  "Siddeswara Swamy Temple", is an ancient Hindu temple of Lord Siddeswara on the hilltop of Siddeswara Gutta in Gurramkonda in India. It is one of the oldest temples in Chittoor District.

The sanctum sanctorum of the temple has Lord Siddeswara along with Parvathi Ammavaru and Nandi The temple is located on a hilltop.

History and legend 
Locals used to celebrate jathara at the time of shivarathri at the temple.  The practice was renewed in 2013 and three new idols were placed in the temple.

References 

Hindu temples in Chittoor district